Mountbellew or Mountbellew Bridge (historically Creggaun, from ) is a town in County Galway, Ireland. It lies mostly within the townland of Treanrevagh (Trian Riabhach) on the N63 national primary road. As of the 2016 census, it had a population of over 770.

Amenities
Mountbellew has a number of shops and small businesses. There are four schools located in the town; St. Mary's National School; two secondary schools, Holy Rosary College and Coláiste an Chreagáin; and the Franciscan Brothers Agricultural College, part of the Atlantic Technological University.

The local secondary school "Holy Rosary College Mountbellew" is home to an All Weather sports facility that was originally built in 2017 with the intention of renting it out to various third parties especially during the winter in aid of raising money for the school. However An Bord Pleanala that the floodlighting of the facility should not be in operation any later than 7:30 PM, it was also ruled that the use of this facility could only be used for school purposes and was not to rented out to third parties. This came after fierce complaints by the residents of local estate, these complaints mostly regarded the light pollution and the noise such a faiclity would have on the estate which was only 30 yards from the sports facility.

Points of interest in the area include the Bellew Estate and woodlands, the man-made pleasure lake, the old forge, the malt house (which now lends its name to a restaurant) and St Mary's Catholic church. The Bellew Estate was once the home of the Grattan-Bellew family, who were Galway parliamentarians during the 18th and 19th centuries. The estate demesne is now a wooded area of forest walks and picnic areas. The village bridge has a milestone inserted in the middle of its parapet.

In 2020 the local authorities and  The Galway County Council had approved the building of a supermarket and filling station.  The site was planned to be built upon by Cahermorris Developments Ltd. However the building of the supermarket and filling station was appealed to An Bord Pleanala by an amount of residents that were living in close proximity to where the new site was scheduled to be built. Reasons stated in objection to the building included that were would be "Chiller Fans" within 50 meters of residential property, the delivery bay of the supermarket would generate "intolerable noise" at all hours of the day and that such a large discount supermarket would not be sustainable for the local business and economy of the small village. In the end it was deemed that “The entire development is completely incompatible with this village and would have a detrimental effect on the location."

In 2021, the discount supermarket chain Aldi announced the opening of a new 7 million Euro store in Mountbellew. 

The local drapery shop Briggs Drapers is a very important amenity to the village, it is ran by local hero Peter Briggs, he has worked behind the counter at the shop for over 60 years. Peter is often found up at 7AM servicing the community by providing breakfasts for many residents including students of the nearby Agricultural College. Peter has worked at the drapery shop since 1952

Franciscan Brothers 
The Franciscan Brothers, a Catholic religious order, came to Mountbellew from Milltown, Dublin, in 1818. The Bellew family invited them and gave them resources of land and a house to get established. The order ran a free primary school until 1884. In 1875 they opened a secondary school (boarding) and in 1898 a special department in the school was set up to prepare students for teacher training colleges.

The order changed from secondary education to agricultural education in 1904 and the Franciscan Brothers’ Agricultural College was founded. This was the first agricultural college in Ireland. In 1986, the college partnered with a predecessor of Galway-Mayo Institute of Technology (GMIT). This cooperation between the two colleges resulted in the setting up of what is now known as the Higher Certificate in Business Studies (Agribusiness). 

The Atlantic Technological University, formed via the merger of Galway-Mayo IT, IT Sligo, and Letterkenny IT in April 2022, has eight campuses across four counties, including one in Mountbellew.

Sport and community
Mountbellew's sporting societies include Mountbellew Moylough GAA club which plays both hurling and Gaelic football. The club colours are black and amber and they play on Mountbellew/Moylough GAA grounds. The senior football team won five Galway Senior Football Championships, in 1964, 1965, 1974, 1986 and 2021.

A monument to the racehorse Bobbyjo can be seen in the town centre. He won the Irish and English grand nationals.

A historic market, promoted by local landlord Christopher Dillon Bellew in the 19th century, still takes place in the triangular 'square' every Tuesday.  The historic weigh-house building is still located across from the square, becoming a garage in the 1900s, and it is now being redeveloped.

Mountbellew in combination with nearby town Moylough are apart of the Irish/French town twinning program which links the two parishes both legally and scocially with the French town of Eliant.

In the 2022-2023 season of FAI Schools Soccer, the local secondary school Holy Rosary College won the FAI Schools Connacht Senior A Cup Final. They won by three goals to 1 after a thrilling first half performance by Holy Rosary featuring a hat-trick from star striker Ryan Nolan

Notable people

 Thomas J. Kelly (1833–1908), leader of the Irish Republican Brotherhood
 James Lawlor Kiernan (1837–1869), Brigadier General in the Union Army during the American Civil War, was born in Mountbellew
 Niamh Kilkenny, sportsperson and All Ireland Camogie Championship winner, attended school locally.

See also 
 List of towns and villages in Ireland

References

External links

 Mountbellew/Moylough Game Preservation Society Website

Towns and villages in County Galway
Planned communities in the Republic of Ireland